Zelovo can refer to the following places:

 Zelovo (Sinj), a village in Croatia
 Zelovo (Muć), a village in Croatia

Notes